No: 309 (Turkish: No: 309), is a Turkish drama television series created by Asli and Banu Zengin for Fox TV that premiered on 1 June 2016, and concluded on 25 October 2017. The series stars Demet Özdemir and Furkan Palalı.

Plot 
In a video played after his death, an elderly millionaire speaks to his entire family. In it, he declares that the first grandchild to marry and have a child will get his share of the family company. Desperate to get that fortune, mothers rush to set up blind dates for their children. Obliged by his mother, Onur goes to his blind date. There he meets Lale, who was there for her blind date with a young doctor also called Onur. The blind date becomes a wild night full of fun and craziness, where both end up getting drunk and spending the night in room 309 of a hotel. In the morning, unable to remember anything about what happened last night, both say goodbye and agree never to see each other again. However, three months later, Lale discovers that she is pregnant with Onur's baby.

Cast 
 Demet Özdemir as Lale Yenilmez Sarıhan
 Furkan Palalı as Onur Sarıhan
 Sumru Yavrucuk as Songül Yenilmez
 Erdal Özyağcılar as Yıldırım Yenilmez
 Nurşim Demir as İsmet Sarıhan
 Gökçe Özyol as Kurtuluş Yorulmaz
 Cihan Ercan as Erol Sarıhan
 Özlem Tokaslan as Yıldız Sarıhan
 Suat Sungur as Fikret Sarıhan
 Sevinç Erbulak as Betül Sarıhan
 Beyti Engin as Şadi Sarıhan
 Fatma Toptaş as Nilüfer Yorulmaz
 İrem Helvacıoğlu as Pelinsu Yalın
 Pelin Uluksar as Nergis Yenilmez
 Murat Tavlı as Samet Yetiş
 Ceren Taşçı as Filiz Sarıhan
 Fatih Ayhan as Doctor Onur Saygın
 Eda Özel as Şebnem Yalın
 Ömrüm Nur Çamçakallı as Gülşah Yorulmaz

International broadcasting 
  - The series was broadcast, starting on October 7, 2017, on Diema Family.
  - The series premiered on October 27, 2022, on VTV3 as Phòng 309.

References

External links 
 

2016 Turkish television series debuts
2017 Turkish television series endings
Turkish television series
Television series produced in Istanbul
Television shows set in Istanbul
Television series set in the 2010s
Turkish drama television series
Turkish-language television shows
Turkish television series based on South Korean television series